The 2015 Prince Edward Island general election was held May 4, 2015, to elect members of the 65th General Assembly of Prince Edward Island. Under amendments passed by the Legislative Assembly of Prince Edward Island in 2008, Prince Edward Island elections are usually held on the first Monday of October in the fourth calendar year, unless it is dissolved earlier by the Lieutenant Governor of Prince Edward Island due to a motion of no confidence. The current government had hinted that an election would be held "before Mother's Day" 2015, and such a dissolution would avoid any conflicts with the next federal election, expected to be held in October 2015.

The governing Liberals were elected to a third consecutive majority government under Premier Wade MacLauchlan, while the Progressive Conservatives made slight gains despite party leader Rob Lantz failing to win election in Charlottetown-Brighton. The Green Party, meanwhile, won its first seat in the legislature, with leader Peter Bevan-Baker elected in Kellys Cross-Cumberland. The New Democratic Party was shut out.

Results

|- bgcolor=CCCCCC
!rowspan="2" colspan="2" align=left|Party
!rowspan="2" align=left|Party leader
!rowspan="2"|Candidates
!colspan="4" align=center|Seats
!colspan="3" style="text-align:center;"|Popular vote
|- bgcolor=CCCCCC
|align="center"|2011
|align="center"|Dissol.
|align="center"|2015
| style="text-align:center;"|Change
| style="text-align:center;"|#
| style="text-align:center;"|%
| style="text-align:center;"|Change

|align=left|Wade MacLauchlan
|align="right"|27
|align="right"|22
|align="right"|20
|align="right"|18
|align="right"| −4
|align="right"|33,481
|align="right"|40.83%
|align="right"|−10.55%

|align=left|Rob Lantz
|align="right"|27
|align="right"|5
|align="right"|3
|align="right"|8
|align="right"| +3
|align="right"|30,663
|align="right"|37.39%
|align="right"|−2.77%

|align=left|Peter Bevan-Baker
|align="right"|24
|align="right"|0
|align="right"|0
|align="right"|1
|align="right"| +1
|align="right"|8,857
|align="right"|10.81%
|align="right"|+6.45%

|align=left|Michael Redmond
|align="right"|27
|align="right"|0
|align="right"|0
|align="right"|0
|align="right"|
|align="right"|8,997
|align="right"|10.97%
|align="right"|+7.81%

|colspan="2" align="left"|Independent
|align="right"|
|align="right"|0
|align="right"|1
|align="right"|0
|align="right"|
|align="right"|
|align="right"|
|align="right"|

|align=left colspan=3|Vacant
|align="right"|
|align="right"|3
|align="right"|-
|align="right"|-
|align="right"|
|align="right"|
|align="right"|
|-
| style="text-align:left;" colspan="3"|Total
| style="text-align:right;"|105
| style="text-align:right;"|27
| style="text-align:right;"|27
| style="text-align:right;"|27
| style="text-align:right;"|
| style="text-align:right;"|81,998
| style="text-align:right;"|
| style="text-align:right;"|
|}

Synopsis of results

 = results as certified in a judicial recount
 = open seat
 = turnout is above provincial average
 = incumbent re-elected in same riding
 = incumbent changed allegiance
 = other incumbent renominated
 = tied for first place - settled by coin toss

Results by region

Timeline

2011
 October 3: The Prince Edward Island Liberal Party under Robert Ghiz is re-elected with a majority government in the 64th Prince Edward Island general election.

2012
 October 13: The New Democratic Party elects Michael Redmond as party leader.
 November 3: The Green Party elects Peter Bevan-Baker as party leader
 December 5: Progressive Conservative leader Olive Crane announces her intention to resign as party leader in January 2013 after party members narrowly vote against having a leadership review. Crane further announces that she will stay on as Leader of the Opposition.

2013
 January 30: Olive Crane resigns as Leader of the Opposition. The Progressive Conservative caucus names Tignish-Palmer Road MLA Hal Perry, a candidate for the interim leadership, as Leader of the Opposition.
 January 31: Olive Crane resigns as Progressive Conservative leader. Georgetown-St. Peters MLA Steven Myers is elected interim PC leader over Leader of the Opposition and Tignish-Palmer Road MLA Hal Perry. Perry initially announces that he will remain Leader of the Opposition, despite Myers' urging that the party leader should hold both positions.
 February 11: Tignish-Palmer Road MLA Hal Perry steps down as Leader of the Opposition, citing internal divisions within the Progressive Conservative Party. Interim PC leader and Georgetown-St. Peters MLA Steven Myers is subsequently named Leader of the Opposition.
 October 3: In what is believed to be the first instance of a sitting MLA crossing the floor, Tignish-Palmer Road MLA Hal Perry leaves the Progressive Conservatives to join the Liberals, citing his concerns with the federal Conservative governments changes to employment insurance.
 October 4: Morell-Mermaid MLA and former Progressive Conservative leader Olive Crane is kicked out of the party. Crane subsequently announces she will sit as an independent.

2014
 November 13: Robert Ghiz announces he will be resigning as Premier in early 2015 as soon as the Prince Edward Island Liberal Party elects a new leader.

2015
 February 21: The Prince Edward Island Liberal Party held its leadership election. As the sole candidate nominated, Wade MacLauchlan was acclaimed the new leader and incoming premier.
 February 23: Robert Ghiz resigns as Premier. Wade MacLauchlan is appointed and sworn in as the new Premier. Later that day, Ghiz, Wes Sheridan, and Robert Vessey resign as MLAs, triggering potential by-elections in their former seats (Charlottetown-Brighton, Kensington-Malpeque, and York-Oyster Bed, respectively).
 February 28: At the party's leadership election, Rob Lantz is elected leader of the Progressive Conservative Party of Prince Edward Island.
 April 6: After being nominated as the Liberal candidate for York-Oyster Bed, Premier Wade MacLauchlan dropped the writ, calling for an election on May 4, 2015.
 April 10: The Island Party drops out of the campaign, due to not having enough candidates 
 April 27: Party leaders' first televised debate, held in Summerside.
 April 30: A second televised debate was held for the party leaders, in Charlottetown.
 May 4: Election results - The Liberals win a third consecutive majority government, with a reduced number of 18 seats. The Progressive Conservatives remain as the official opposition, with an increase to 8 seats. The Greens make Prince Edward Island political history, winning their first seat.

Opinion polls

Results
Candidates' names appear as recorded by Elections PEI
Party leaders' names are in bold; cabinet ministers' names are in italics.

Cardigan

|-
|bgcolor="whitesmoke"|4. Belfast-Murray River
|
|Charlie McGeoghegan1,095 - 41.1%
||
|Darlene Compton1,203 - 45.1%
|
|Jordan MacPhee152 - 5.7%
|
|Alan Hicken216 - 8.1%
|| 
|Charlie McGeoghegan
|-
|bgcolor="whitesmoke"|2. Georgetown-St. Peters
|
|Russ Stewart1,170 - 38.8%
||
|Steven Myers1,448 - 48.0%
|
|Heather Gallant145 - 4.8%
|
|Nathan Bushey256 - 8.5%
|| 
|Steven Myers
|-
|bgcolor="whitesmoke"|3. Montague-Kilmuir
||
|Allen Roach1,060 - 41.8%
|
|Andrew Daggett785 - 31.0%
|
|Jason Furness106 - 4.2%
|
|Mike Redmond585 - 23.1%
|| 
|Allen Roach
|-
|bgcolor="whitesmoke"|7. Morell-Mermaid
|
|Daniel MacDonald1,114 - 37.1%
||
|Sidney MacEwen1,501 - 50.0%
|
|Meaghan Lister177 - 5.9%
|
|Edith Perry211 - 7.0%
|| 
|Olive Crane†
|-
|bgcolor="whitesmoke"|1. Souris-Elmira
|
|Tommy Kickham951 - 35.8%
||
|Colin LaVie1,179 - 44.4%
|
| 
|
|Susan Birt528 - 19.9%
||
|Colin LaVie
|-
|bgcolor="whitesmoke"|6. Stratford-Kinlock
|
|David Dunphy1,453 - 33.9%
||
|James Aylward2,155 - 50.3%
|
|Samantha Saunders330 - 7.7%
|
|Chris van Ouwerkerk350 - 8.2%
||
|James Aylward
|-
|bgcolor="whitesmoke"|5. Vernon River-Stratford*
||
|Alan McIsaac*1,173 - 41.3%
|
|Mary Ellen McInnis*1,173 - 41.3%
|
|Nicholas Graveline234 - 8.2%
|
|Kathleen Romans258 - 9.1%
||
|Alan McIsaac
|}
 This riding vote count resulted in a tie between McIsaac and McInnis. As a result, a coin toss was held, which determined McIsaac, the Liberal candidate, as the winner.

Malpeque

|-
|bgcolor="whitesmoke"|19. Borden-Kinkora
|
|Ramona Roberts1,154 - 34.1%
||
|Jamie Fox1,597 - 47.1%
|
|Ranald MacFarlane511 - 15.1%
|
|Aleida Tweten126 - 3.7%
||
|George Webster†
|-
|bgcolor="whitesmoke"|16. Cornwall-Meadowbank
||
|Heath MacDonald1,444 - 46.3%
|
|Michael Drake1,056 - 33.8%
|
|Rosalyn Abbott377 - 12.1%
|
|Jennifer Coughlin243 - 7.8%
||
|Ron MacKinley†
|-
|bgcolor="whitesmoke"|17. Kellys Cross-Cumberland
|
|Valerie Docherty1,046 - 27.6%
|
|Randy Robar609 - 16.1%
||
|Peter Bevan-Baker2,077 - 54.8%
|
|Jesse Cousins58 - 1.5%
||
|Valerie Docherty
|-
|bgcolor="whitesmoke"|20. Kensington-Malpeque
|
|Paul Montgomery1,033 - 28.3%
||
|Matthew MacKay1,984 - 54.3%
|
|Lynne Lund374 - 10.2%
|
|Joseph Larkin264 - 7.2%
||
|Vacant
|-
|bgcolor="whitesmoke"|18. Rustico-Emerald
|
|Bertha Campbell1,152 - 34.3%
||
|Brad Trivers1,585 - 47.2%
|
|Marianne Janowicz325 - 9.7%
|
|Leah-Jane Hayward294 - 8.8%
||
|Carolyn Bertram†
|-
|bgcolor="whitesmoke"|9. York-Oyster Bed
||
|Wade MacLauchlan1,938 - 47.7%
|
|Jim "Benson" Carragher1,338 - 32.9%
|
|Thane Bernard347 - 8.5%
|
|Gordon Gay442 - 10.9%
||
|Vacant
|}

Charlottetown

|-
|bgcolor="whitesmoke"|13. Charlottetown-Brighton
||
|Jordan Brown1,054 - 39.0%
|
|Rob Lantz1,032 - 38.2%
|
|Derrick Biso352 - 13.0%
|
|Bob MacLean265 - 9.8%
|
|Vacant
|-
|bgcolor="whitesmoke"|14. Charlottetown-Lewis Point
||
|Kathleen Casey1,040 - 34.3%
|
|Dianne Young821 - 27.0%
|
|Doug Millington244 - 8.0%
|
|Gord McNeilly931 - 30.7%
|| 
|Kathleen Casey
|-
|bgcolor="whitesmoke"|11. Charlottetown-Parkdale
||
|Doug Currie1,166 - 43.7%
|
|Lynn MacLaren699 - 26.2%
|
|Becka Viau511 - 19.2%
|
|Andrew Watts292 - 10.9%
|| 
|Doug Currie
|-
|bgcolor="whitesmoke"|10. Charlottetown-Sherwood
||
|Robert Mitchell1,425 - 45.8%
|
|Mike Gillis1,031 - 33.1%
|
|Mitchell Gallant295 - 9.5%
|
|Karalee McAskill360 - 11.6%
|| 
|Robert Mitchell
|-
|bgcolor="whitesmoke"|12. Charlottetown-Victoria Park
||
|Richard Brown955 - 39.4%
|
|Joey Kitson666 - 27.5%
|
|Darcie Lanthier456 - 18.8%
|
|Chris Clay348 - 14.4%
|| 
|Richard Brown
|-
|bgcolor="whitesmoke"|8. Tracadie-Hillsborough Park
||
|Buck Watts1,354 - 45.7%
|
|Darren Creamer826 - 27.8%
|
|Isaac Williams237 - 8.0%
|
|Jason Murray549 - 18.5%
||
|Buck Watts
|-
|bgcolor="whitesmoke"|15. West Royalty-Springvale
||
|Bush Dumville1,389 - 37.6%
|
|Linda Clements1,330 - 36.0%
|
|Charles Sanderson462 - 12.5%
|
|Peter Meggs516 - 14.0%
||
|Bush Dumville
|}

Egmont

|-
|bgcolor="whitesmoke"|26. Alberton-Roseville
||
|Pat Murphy1,569 - 53.7%
|
|John Griffin1,166 - 39.9%
|
| 
|
|Orville Lewis188 - 6.4%
|| 
|Pat Murphy
|-
|bgcolor="whitesmoke"|24. Evangeline-Miscouche
||
|Sonny Gallant1,419 - 62.6%
|
|Debbie Montgomery586 - 25.8%
|
|Jordan Cameron125 - 5.5%
|
|Grant Gallant138 - 6.1%
|| 
|Sonny Gallant
|-
|bgcolor="whitesmoke"|25. O'Leary-Inverness
||
|Robert Henderson1,310 - 48.8%
|
|Daniel MacDonald1,063 - 39.6%
|
| 
|
|Billy Mackendrick311 - 11.6%
|| 
|Robert Henderson
|-
|bgcolor="whitesmoke"|22. Summerside-St. Eleanors
||
|Tina Mundy1,246 - 41.2%
|
|Major Stewart1,098 - 36.3%
|
|Caleb Adams321 - 10.6%
|
|Olivia Wood358 - 11.8%
|| 
|Gerard Greenan†
|-
|bgcolor="whitesmoke"|21. Summerside-Wilmot
||
|Janice Sherry1,135 - 39.4%
|
|Brian Ramsay1,105 - 38.4%
|
|Donald MacFadzen-Reid285 - 9.9%
|
|Scott Gaudet353 - 12.3%
|| 
|Janice Sherry
|-
|bgcolor="whitesmoke"|27. Tignish-Palmer Road
||
|Hal Perry1,486 - 58.2%
|
|Joseph Profit818 - 32.1%
|
|Malcolm Pitre167 - 6.5%
|
|John A'Hearn81 - 3.2%
|| 
|Hal Perry
|-
|bgcolor="whitesmoke"|23. Tyne Valley-Linkletter
||
|Paula Biggar1,147 - 43.0%
|
|Ryan Williams810 - 30.3%
|
|Shelagh Young240 - 9.0%
|
|Jacqueline Tuplin473 - 17.7%
|| 
|Paula Biggar
|}

References

Further reading

External links
 P.E.I. Votes 2015: Tracking the candidates

2015 elections in Canada
2015 in Prince Edward Island
2015
May 2015 events in Canada